Orellia tragopogonis is a species of tephritid or fruit flies in the genus Orellia of the family Tephritidae.

Distribution
It is located in Spain.

References

Tephritinae
Insects described in 2003
Diptera of Europe